Pastor Ruby Terry (born February 1952 as Ruby Karen Frances or Ruby Karen Francis), is an American gospel musician and Christian R&B artist. She started her music career, in 1990 with the release of Chapter One by Malaco Records, and all of her released have been released by that label. Her second album, Live with the Southwest Louisiana Mass Choir, was released in 1992, and it was her breakthrough release upon the Billboard magazine Gospel Albums chart. The third album, What a Time, came out in 1994, and this release charted on the aforementioned chart. She released, God Can Do It, in 1996, yet this failed to chart.

Early life
Pastor Terry was born in Columbia, Mississippi, in February 1952 as Ruby Karen Francis or Frances, to Rev. L. J. Francis, and his wife. She was raised in Lawton, Oklahoma, where she was a graduated of Eisenhower High School, and went on to earn 119 hours of an education degree at Seward County Community College and Wichita State University.

Music career
Her music recording career commenced in 1990, with the release of Chapter One by Malaco Records, and they are the only imprint she released albums with during her career. The second album, Live with the Southwest Louisiana Mass Choir, was released in 1992, and this was her breakthrough released upon the Billboard magazine Gospel Albums chart at No. 11. She released, What a Time, in 1994, and this placed on the aforementioned chart at No. 39. The fourth album, God Can Do It, came out in 1996, yet this album failed to chart.

Personal life
Evangelist Terry met her husband, Pastor Ivanhoe Terry, while she was in pursuing her degree in education, and they relocated to Lake Charles, Louisiana. She has two sons, Eric and Christopher Terry. After the death of her husband, Evangelist Terry became the Founder/Pastor of Fountain of Life COGIC in Lake Charles. She serves as Assistant Jurisdictional Supervisor of the Greater New Orleans Jurisdiction, COGIC.

Discography

Studio albums

References

1952 births
Living people
African-American songwriters
African-American Christians
Musicians from Mississippi
Musicians from Oklahoma
Musicians from Louisiana
Songwriters from Mississippi
Songwriters from Oklahoma
Songwriters from Louisiana
People from Columbia, Mississippi
Malaco Records artists
21st-century African-American people
20th-century African-American people